Frantschach-Sankt Gertraud is a town in the district of Wolfsberg in the Austrian state of Carinthia.

Geography
The municipality lies north of Wolfsberg on the boundary with Styria.

References

Cities and towns in Wolfsberg District